MS Ponzano was a British cargo ship. It was one of the first British merchant vessels to be sunk during the Second World War. Ponzano, 1,346 tons, was built in 1928 for the MacAndrews Line service between Britain and Spain.

On 13 November 1939, Ponzano hit a mine and sank off North Foreland. Its crew was rescued by two Norwegian fishing boats.

The ship's fate was blamed on a wrongly decoded radio signal, which delayed minesweeping trawlers from passing on a warning about the extent of mines laid by the Germans.

References

Merchant ships of the United Kingdom
Ships sunk by mines
1927 ships
Maritime incidents in November 1939
World War II shipwrecks in the North Sea